Anthony John Lewis MBE (25 February 1942 – 15 March 2020) was a mathematician who, along with Frank Duckworth, developed the Duckworth–Lewis method of resetting targets in interrupted limited-overs cricket matches.

Personal life
Lewis was born in Bolton, Lancashire. He attended Kirkham Grammar School and graduated from Sheffield University with a degree in Mathematics and Statistics.

Lewis was appointed Member of the Order of the British Empire (MBE) in the 2010 Birthday Honours.

Lewis died on 15 March 2020, aged 78.

Career

Lewis was formerly a lecturer at the University of the West of England (UWE). In January 2008, he retired as a lecturer in Quantitative Research Methods from Oxford Brookes University.

He was also a former chairman of the Western Operational Research Discussion Society and was a keynote speaker at the Second IMA International Conference on Mathematics in Sport in 2009. Lewis also undertook various consultancy roles in England and Australia.

Duckworth-Lewis Method

In the 1980s, Frank Duckworth had proposed a method of resetting targets in interrupted limited-overs cricket matches. After the 1992 Cricket World Cup, commentator Christopher Martin-Jenkins asked for a better calculation system. Lewis read Duckworth's 1992 paper Fair Play in Foul Weather and together they devised the Duckworth-Lewis Method. In 2014, Steven Stern became custodian of the method, and it was renamed the Duckworth–Lewis–Stern method.

References

External links
Profile at Oxford Brookes University
Catalogue of Tony Lewis' papers concerning the D/L method, held at the Modern Records Centre, University of Warwick

1942 births
2020 deaths
Limited overs cricket
Academics of the University of the West of England, Bristol
Members of the Order of the British Empire
English statisticians
Alumni of the University of Sheffield
People from Bolton
Academics of Oxford Brookes University
People educated at Kirkham Grammar School